Fatima Ali (August 8, 1989 – January 25, 2019) was a Pakistani-American executive chef, restaurateur and television personality. She is known for her successful appearances on reality cooking shows Chopped and Top Chef, and for winning a James Beard Foundation Award for her essay on living with sarcoma.

Early life 
Fatima Ali was born and raised in Pakistan, dividing her time between Karachi and Lahore. She was educated at the Karachi Grammar School. Ali was the daughter of educator Farazeh Durrani and lawyer Ashtar Ausaf Ali, the Attorney General for Pakistan from 2016 to 2018 and again from May 2022. She learned to cook from her father, her grandmother, and her family's cook, Qadir. She immigrated to America at age 18 to attend the Culinary Institute of America, graduating in 2011.

Career
Ali began her culinary career as a junior sous chef at Café Centro in New York City. In 2012, she won an episode of Chopped (Season 12, episode 2, "A Guts Reaction") on the Food Network. She continued her career in New York City, becoming the youngest executive sous chef at Stella 34 Trattoria at Macy's Herald Square, and then the executive sous chef at La Fonda del Sol.

In 2017, Ali was a contestant on Top Chef: Colorado. Although she finished in seventh place, she was voted the fan favorite.

Illness and death
After competing on Top Chef,  Ali was diagnosed with Ewing's sarcoma and underwent surgery at Memorial Sloan Kettering Cancer Center in January 2018. After undergoing chemotherapy, she was initially declared cancer-free, and in April 2018, she cooked in public at the Pebble Beach Food and Wine Festival. However, in October 2018, in a personal essay published by Bon Appétit, Fatima Ali reported that her cancer had returned and become terminal. She died at her family's home in San Marino, California, on January 25, 2019, at the age of 29.

She was buried in Lahore on February 1, 2019. In April 2019, Ali was posthumously awarded a James Beard Foundation Award for her essay. Her memoir, Savor, was published posthumously in 2022.

References

External links 
 
 
 Bravo TV: Fatima Ali

1989 births
2019 deaths
Pakistani chefs
Pakistani emigrants to the United States
Top Chef contestants
American chefs
American women chefs
Culinary Institute of America alumni
James Beard Foundation Award winners
Businesspeople from Lahore
Karachi Grammar School alumni
Deaths from cancer in California
21st-century American women